Hampstead is a historic plantation house located near Tunstall, New Kent County, Virginia.  It was built about 1825, as a two-story, rectangular Federal style brick dwelling with a hipped roof. The front facade features alternating window bays and pilasters and a central two-story pedimented projecting portico.  Also located on the property are the contributing ruins of a granary, an 18th-century cottage and an icehouse

It was listed on the National Register of Historic Places in 1970.

References

Houses on the National Register of Historic Places in Virginia
Federal architecture in Virginia
Houses completed in 1825
Houses in New Kent County, Virginia
Plantation houses in Virginia
National Register of Historic Places in New Kent County, Virginia